Hadi Habibinejad is an Iranian football midfielder who currently plays for Iranian football club Malavan in the Azadegan League.

Club career

Foolad
He started his career with Foolad at youth level. Subsequently he was signed to the first team by Dragan Skočić under a three-year contract keeping him at Foolad until 2017. He made his debut for Foolad in the second fixture of the 2014–15 Iran Pro League season against Persepolis, as a substitute for Sasan Ansari.

Club career statistics

References

External links
 Hadi Habibinejad  at IranLeague.ir

Living people
Iranian footballers
Foolad FC players
1995 births
Association football midfielders